In graph theory, a branch of mathematics, Fleischner's theorem gives a sufficient condition for a graph to contain a Hamiltonian cycle. It is named after Herbert Fleischner, who published its proof in 1974.

Definitions and statement
An undirected graph  is Hamiltonian if it contains a cycle that touches each of its vertices exactly once. It is 2-vertex-connected if it does not have an articulation vertex, a vertex whose deletion would leave the remaining graph disconnected. Not every 2-vertex-connected graph is Hamiltonian; counterexamples include the Petersen graph and the complete bipartite graph .

Fleischner's theorem states that the square of a finite 2-vertex-connected graph with at least three vertices must always be Hamiltonian.

Extensions

In addition to having a Hamiltonian cycle, the square of a 2-vertex-connected graph  must also be Hamiltonian connected (meaning that it has a Hamiltonian path starting and ending at any two designated vertices) and 1-Hamiltonian (meaning that if any vertex is deleted, the remaining graph still has a Hamiltonian cycle).

If a graph  is not 2-vertex-connected, then its square may or may not have a Hamiltonian cycle, and determining whether it does have one is NP-complete.

An infinite graph cannot have a Hamiltonian cycle, because every cycle is finite, but Carsten Thomassen proved that if  is an infinite locally finite 2-vertex-connected graph with a single end then  necessarily has a doubly infinite Hamiltonian path. More generally, if  is locally finite, 2-vertex-connected, and has any number of ends, then  has a Hamiltonian circle. In a compact topological space formed by viewing the graph as a simplicial complex and adding an extra point at infinity to each of its ends, a Hamiltonian circle is defined to be a subspace that is homeomorphic to a Euclidean circle and covers every vertex.

Algorithms
The Hamiltonian cycle in the square of an -vertex 2-connected graph can be found in linear time, improving over the first algorithmic solution by Lau of running time .
Fleischner's theorem can be used to provide a 2-approximation to the bottleneck traveling salesman problem in metric spaces.

History
A proof of Fleischner's theorem was announced by Herbert Fleischner in 1971 and published by him in 1974, solving a 1966 conjecture of Crispin Nash-Williams also made independently by L. W. Beineke and Michael D. Plummer. In his review of Fleischner's paper, Nash-Williams wrote that it had solved "a well known problem which has for several years defeated the ingenuity of other graph-theorists".

Fleischner's original proof was complicated. Václav Chvátal, in the work in which he invented graph toughness, observed that the square of a -vertex-connected graph is necessarily -tough; he conjectured that 2-tough graphs are Hamiltonian, from which another proof of Fleischner's theorem would have followed. Counterexamples to this conjecture were later discovered, but the possibility that a finite bound on toughness might imply Hamiltonicity remains an important open problem in graph theory.

References

Notes

Primary sources

.
.
.
.
.
.
.
.
.
.
.
.
.
.
.
.

Secondary sources
.
.

Theorems in graph theory